Nassauvia serpens, the snakeplant, is a species of plant in the family Asteraceae. It is endemic to the Falkland Islands. Its natural habitats are temperate shrublands, and rocky areas. Although assessed as Least Concern, it is experiencing continued habitat loss.

References

Nassauvieae
Flora of the Falkland Islands
Least concern plants
Taxonomy articles created by Polbot